AutoNavi Software Co., Ltd.) is a Chinese web mapping, navigation and location-based services provider, founded in 2001. One of its subsidiary companies, Beijing Mapabc Co. Ltd.  (www.mapabc.com), is a map website in China. AutoNavi was acquired by Alibaba Group in 2014. It offers its map services at Amap.com and as the Amap mobile app. It is known as Gaode in Chinese.

AutoNavi has provided mapping data to Google since 2006, although this has not been updated for some time.

AutoNavi also provides mapping data of China for Apple Maps, which was introduced with iOS 6. This is only available when the Apple device is located within China.

AutoNavi's own map application was the top mobile map app in China in 2012, with over 100 million users.

See also 
List of online map services
Google Maps
TomTom
Mapscape BV
Mapbox

References

External links 
Official website
AutoNavi Maps

Companies based in Beijing
Companies listed on the Nasdaq
Alibaba Group acquisitions
2014 mergers and acquisitions
Chinese brands